Kilpeläinen is a Finnish surname. Notable people with the surname include:

 Edvard Kilpeläinen (1879–1941), Finnish Lutheran clergyman and politician
 Viljo Kilpeläinen (1906–1937), Finnish industrial worker and politician
 Yrjö Kilpeläinen (1907–1955), Finnish journalist, educationist and politician
 Tuure Kilpeläinen (born 1970), Finnish musician and singer-songwriter
 Eero Kilpeläinen (born 1985), Finnish ice hockey player

Finnish-language surnames